The Club DeLisa, also written Delisa or De Lisa, was an African-American nightclub and music venue in Chicago, Illinois. Located at 5521 South State Street (State Street and Garfield Avenue, on the South Side), it was possibly the most prestigious venue in the city, together with the Regal Theater and the Rhumboogie Café, the 800–seat Club DeLisa played a key role in the city's association with jazz, blues, rhythm and blues and soul music. It closed in February 1958, but was re-opened as The Club in 1966.

History
The Club DeLisa was owned by the four DeLisa brothers, Louis, John, Jimmy and Mike. It opened in 1933. In 1941, the original building burned down but was soon replaced with the New Club DeLisa.  Nightly entertainment at the club was in a variety-show format. The show featured singers, comedians, dancers, and the DeLisa chorines, accompanied by a house band that ranged in size from 7 to 12 pieces, depending on the club's revenues.  Another less heralded source of revenue was gambling, in the club's basement. During its heyday in the 1930s and 1940s, the club would remain open 24 hours a day, offering round-the-clock entertainment with musicians, dancers and vaudeville acts.

Among the musicians and performers associated with the venue over the years were Red Saunders, whose band was in residence from 1937 until 1945 and later returned in 1947. The band stayed until the club closed in 1958, Fletcher Henderson, Count Basie, Sun Ra, Johnny Pate, Joe Williams, LaVaughn Robinson, George Kirby, Sonny Cohn, Earl Washington, Leon Washington, Albert Ammons, LaVern Baker, and Reverend Gatemouth Moore (1946–1947 and 1948–1949). The Club DeLisa closed its doors on February 16, 1958, after the deaths of two of the DeLisa brothers. The closing of the club was commemorated in the February 6, 1958 issue of Chicago-based Jet magazine, stating the club would close on February 16 of that year.

House Bands
Red Saunders: 1937–1945; 1947–1958
Jesse Miller: June, 1945–February, 1946
Fletcher Henderson: February, 1946

The Club 
When DJs E. Rodney Jones and Pervis Spann re-opened the venue under the new name, Cannonball Adderley's quintet was one of the first bands to perform there, in March 1966. Although Adderley's October 1966 album Mercy, Mercy, Mercy! Live at 'The Club' was supposedly recorded at the venue, it was in fact recorded at Capitol's Hollywood studio with a live audience. It was the tracks later released on Money in the Pocket that had been recorded live at The Club.

References 

Jazz clubs in Chicago
Music venues completed in 1933
Historically African-American theaters and music venues